Ejinhoro may refer to:

Ejin Horo Banner, subdivision of Inner Mongolia, China
Ejinhoro Formation, geological formation in Inner Mongolia, China